Muamer Aissa Barsham (born 3 January 1994 in Doha) is a Qatari athlete specialising in the high jump. He won his first major senior medal at the 2014 Asian Games.

He is the younger brother of another high jumper, Mutaz Essa Barshim, who is a multiple medalist at continental and world events and the current Asian record holder. Just like his brother he is coached by Stanisław Szczyrba.

He has personal bests of 2.28 metres outdoors (Sopot 2014) and 2.25 metres indoor in Ireland (Athlone)

Competition record

External links
 Muamer Aissa Barsham on eurosport

References

1994 births
Living people
People from Doha
Qatari male high jumpers
Asian Games medalists in athletics (track and field)
Athletes (track and field) at the 2014 Asian Games
Qatari people of Sudanese descent
Sudanese emigrants to Qatar
Naturalised citizens of Qatar
Asian Games bronze medalists for Qatar
Medalists at the 2014 Asian Games